Gerald Francis Coleman (September 14, 1924 – January 5, 2014) was a Major League Baseball (MLB) second baseman for the New York Yankees and manager of the San Diego Padres for one year. Coleman was named the rookie of the year in 1949 by Associated Press, and was an All-Star in 1950 and later that year was named the World Series Most Valuable Player. Yankees teams on which he was a player appeared in six World Series during his career, winning four times. Coleman served as a Marine Corps pilot in World War II and the Korean War, flying combat missions with the VMSB-341 Torrid Turtles (WWII) and VMA-323 Death Rattlers (Korea) in both wars. He later became a broadcaster, and he was honored in 2005 by the National Baseball Hall of Fame with the Ford C. Frick Award for his broadcasting contributions.

Playing career

Born in San Jose, California, Coleman graduated from Lowell High School, then spent his entire playing career with the New York Yankees. He played six years in the Yankees' minor league system before reaching the big club in 1949. Coleman hit .275 in his first year and led all second basemen in fielding percentage. He was the Associated Press rookie of the year in 1949 and finished third in balloting by Baseball Writers' Association of America.

Coleman avoided a sophomore slump by earning a selection to the All-Star team in 1950. He then shone in the World Series with brilliant defense, earning him the BBWAA's Babe Ruth Award as the series's most valuable player.

Nicknamed "The Colonel" because he was a U.S. Marine Corps lieutenant colonel, Coleman was a Marine aviator who postponed his entry into professional baseball in World War II and later left baseball to serve in the Korean War. While a Marine Corps aviator he flew 120 combat missions (57 during World War II and 63 in Korea). and received numerous honors and medals including two Distinguished Flying Crosses. In the years before his death, Coleman received numerous honors, including induction into the USMC Sports Hall of Fame, for his call to duty.  Coleman was the only Major League Baseball player to see combat in two wars. (While Ted Williams served during both World War II and Korea, he flew combat missions only in the Korean War.) 

Coleman's career declined after he was injured the following season, relegating him to a bench role. He was forced to retire after the 1957 season, but he left on a good note, hitting .364 in a World Series loss against the Milwaukee Braves. He appeared in the World Series six times in his career, winning four of them.

Coleman appeared on the February 5, 1957 of the CBS game show To Tell the Truth as an imposter for singer Don Rondo. He received two votes.

Broadcasting career
In 1958, New York Yankees general manager George Weiss named Coleman personnel director, which involved Coleman scouting minor league players. Roy Hamey terminated Coleman from that position, upon becoming the Yankees' general manager. It was only after Coleman met with Howard Cosell that Coleman considered becoming a broadcaster.

In 1960, Coleman began a broadcasting career with CBS television, conducting pregame interviews on the network's Game of the Week broadcasts. His broadcasting career nearly ended that year; he was in the midst of an interview with Cookie Lavagetto when the national anthem began playing.  Coleman kept the interview going through the anthem, prompting an avalanche of angry letters to CBS.

In 1963, he began a seven-year run calling Yankees games on WCBS radio and WPIX television. During this time, he lived in Ridgewood, New Jersey, which he described as being "19.9 miles from Yankee Stadium, but a million miles from New York".

After broadcasting for the California Angels for two years, in 1972 Coleman became the lead radio announcer for the San Diego Padres, a position he held every year until his death in 2014 except for 1980, when the Padres hired him to manage (predating a trend of broadcasters-turned-managers that started in the late 1990s). He was known in San Diego for his signature catchphrase, "You can hang a star on that one, baby!", which he would deliver after a spectacular play. During home games, the phrase would be accompanied by a tinsel star swinging from a fishing pole that emanated from his broadcast booth. Coleman's other catchphrases included "Oh Doctor!", "And the beat goes on," and "The natives are getting restless."

Coleman lent these catchphrases to great use when the Padres defeated the Chicago Cubs in Game 5 of the 1984 National League Championship Series to clinch the pennant and their first ever trip to the World Series.

Here's the Goose...the 1–1 pitch. A one hopper to Nettles, to Wiggins...and the Padres have the National League pennant!!! Oh doctor, you can hang a star on that baby!!!

He also called national regular-season and postseason broadcasts for CBS Radio from the mid-1970s to 1997.

During an interview in the height of the steroids scandal in 2005, Coleman stated, "If I'm emperor, the first time 50 games, the second time 100 games and the third strike you're out", referring to how baseball should suspend players for being caught taking steroids. After the 2005 World Series, Major League Baseball put a similar policy in effect.

Coleman was known as the "Master of the Malaprop" for making sometimes embarrassing mistakes on the microphone, but he was nonetheless popular. In 2005, he was given the Ford C. Frick Award of the National Baseball Hall of Fame for broadcasting excellence, and is one of six Frick award winners who also played in the Major Leagues (the others are Joe Garagiola, Tony Kubek, Tim McCarver, Bob Uecker and Ken Harrelson.)

He was inducted into the San Diego Padres Hall of Fame in 2001. In fall 2007, Coleman was inducted to the National Radio Hall of Fame as a sports broadcaster for his years as the play-by-play voice of the San Diego Padres.  The Padres would also dedicate their press box to Coleman, renaming it "The Jerry Coleman Broadcast Center".

Ted Leitner and Andy Masur replaced Coleman for most of the radio broadcasting efforts for each Padres game.  He did, however, still work middle innings as a color analyst. As of the 2010 season, he reduced his broadcast schedule down to 20–30 home day games. , Coleman was the third-oldest active play-by-play announcer, behind only fellow Hall of Famers Felo Ramirez and Ralph Kiner.

Coleman collaborated on his autobiography with longtime New York Times writer Richard Goldstein; their book An American Journey: My Life on the Field, In the Air, and On the Air was published in 2008. On September 15, 2012, the Padres unveiled a Coleman statue at Petco Park. Coleman's statue is the second statue at Petco Park, the other being of Hall of Fame outfielder Tony Gwynn.

Awards

Coleman was the recipient of the following medals:
 Distinguished Flying Cross (2)
 Air Medal (13)
 American Campaign Medal
 Asiatic-Pacific Campaign Medal
 World War II Victory Medal
 National Defense Service Medal
 Korean Service Medal
 United Nations Service Medal
 Philippine Liberation Medal

In 2011, Coleman was inducted into the International Aerospace Hall of Fame in a ceremony at the San Diego Air & Space Museum for his service as a combat pilot in World War II and the Korean War.  Although several Major League ballplayers flew during WWII, he was the only active member of MLB to do the deed twice, forgoing his career to fly in combat in both wars. The SDASM restored a vintage F4U "Corsair" fighter-bomber in the markings of Coleman's aircraft during the Korean War and it is displayed under their SBD "Dauntless" dive bomber (which Coleman flew in combat during WW2).

Death
Coleman's death was reported by the San Diego Padres on January 5, 2014. He died after being hospitalized after a fall in his home. He was 89. Coleman was interred at Miramar National Cemetery after a private funeral.

Legacy
In 2015, a sports facility at Marine Corps Recruit Depot San Diego was named in honor of Coleman.

See also

References

External links

 Jerry Coleman Ford C. Frick Award biography at the National Baseball Hall of Fame
 
 

1924 births
2014 deaths
American League All-Stars
American memoirists
Baseball players from San Jose, California
California Angels announcers
Ford C. Frick Award recipients
Major League Baseball broadcasters
Major League Baseball second basemen
New York Yankees announcers
New York Yankees players
People from Ridgewood, New Jersey
Recipients of the Air Medal
Recipients of the Distinguished Flying Cross (United States)
San Diego Padres announcers
San Diego Padres managers
United States Marine Corps personnel of the Korean War
United States Marine Corps colonels
United States Marine Corps pilots of World War II
American Korean War pilots
United States Naval Aviators
United States Marine Corps reservists
Burials at Miramar National Cemetery
Military personnel from New Jersey